Randall Wade Cunningham II (born January 4, 1996) is a former American high jumper. He competed collegiately for the USC Trojans Men's track & field team. A dual-sport athlete, he also played quarterback at Bishop Gorman High School. He is a five-time Nevada Interscholastic Activities Association (NIAA) state champion (three times in track and twice in football). He is a 3-time NCAA Track Champion, and 5-time NCAA All-American, U.S. Junior National Champion, and Pan American Junior Athletics Championships Champion.

He was the 2013 Nevada Track & Field Gatorade Athlete of the Year. He won the NIAA state high jump championship as a freshman, as a junior and as a senior.

In football, he led Gorman to its fifth consecutive Nevada Interscholastic Activities Association (NIAA) state championship in 2013 and declined numerous Division I Football Bowl Subdivision  (FBS) scholarship offers as well as an offer to play football at Yale University. He is the son of retired National Football League quarterback Randall Cunningham, nephew of retired NFL fullback Sam Cunningham and older brother of World Champion Vashti Cunningham.

During his freshman year at USC, he became an All-American by placing 8th in the year-end National Collegiate Athletic Association (NCAA) outdoor championships. During the subsequent summer he became the U.S. Junior National high jump Champion and won a gold medal at the 2015 Pan American Junior Athletics Championships. He won the 2016 NCAA outdoor championships as a sophomore and was an All-American as a junior. He won the NCAA indoor championship as a senior.

Career

Football
Cunningham attended nearby Silverado High School in Las Vegas for his freshman season. His father, who had previously coached his youth teams, was hired as the football team's offensive coordinator and for the track team's staff in December 2009. In August 2011, his father resigned his positions and transferred his son to Bishop Gorman just prior to his sophomore year.

Due to NIAA rules which require a transfer student to wait a year before participating in athletic activities, Randall II was required to sit out his sophomore year in both football and track and field at Bishop Gorman. Then, he backed up four-time state champion starting quarterback Anu Solomon as a junior. That season, he compiled 298 yards and two touchdowns on 21–32 passing with four interceptions and added 42 rushes for 483 yards and seven touchdowns. By his junior year, his 40-yard dash speed was laser-timed at 4.6 seconds. As a senior, he inherited a team that Solomon had led to four consecutive state championships. Despite not starting until his senior season, he entered the year with football scholarship offers from Mississippi State, LSU, Baylor, Syracuse, Arizona State, Utah and UNLV. USA Today predicted that Baylor and LSU may be favorites because of their strong track programs.

During his senior season, the team played a schedule of out-of-state schools for its first 6 games before beginning league competition. Bishop Gorman won 4 of those games. Its October 4 contest with Miami's Booker T. Washington High School was broadcast on ESPNU at a time when Washington was the number one ranked high school in the country. By that time, he had added offers from Kansas State and Yale. In the five previous seasons under head coach Tony Sanchez, Bishop Gorman had gone 60–5 and not lost by more than 14 points. Bishop Gorman entered the game with national rankings of 18 by Rivals.com, 32 by Student Sports. Gorman trailed 14–12 with 8:35 remaining when Cunningham fumbled. Washington scored a touchdown and then another following Cunningham's third interception, resulting in a 28–12 defeat. Subsequently, Cunningham led Gorman through an undefeated Southwest League regular season, marking the seventh consecutive such occurrence for the school. By mid-November, Cunningham stated "I like USC, UCLA, Kansas State, Texas, ASU, and Indiana - and Oregon as well". On December 7, he led Gorman to a 48–14 victory over Edward C. Reed High School in the state championship, rushing for 4 touchdowns and 213 yards on 22 carries and throwing for a touchdown and 111 yards on 9-of-11 passing. Cunningham was briefly recruited by Clay Helton, USC quarterback coach under Steve Sarkisian, but USC did not make him a football scholarship offer. After accepting a track scholarship to USC, Cunningham announced he would attempt to walk-on to the football team.

Track
As a sophomore, he sat out of NIAA competition after transferring. By April 11 of his 2013 junior season, he had already cleared , which was the NIAA state championship record, four times that season. He earned the 2013 Nevada Track & Field Gatorade Player of the Year award. On January 3, 2014, he made a verbal commitment to the USC Trojans track team, shunning over 30 football scholarship offers. He was surpassed by Bryant O'Georgia of Arizona by one quarter inch in May.

His top 8 finish in the NCAAs earned him All-American recognition. In his freshman year, Randall was coached by 2-time Olympian Jamie Nieto who took over as the USC assistant coach in charge of jumps and multi-events on August 20, 2014. His sister Vashti also won gold at that same competition.

The trials were held during a torrential downpour that was deemed severe enough to suspend the women's pole vault event and that seemed to impair the men's discus event.

As a junior, Cunningham was recognized on March 6 as the west region Men's Field Athlete of the Year for the indoor season by the United States Track & Field and Cross Country Coaches Association.
 

Personal
In a highly anticipated birth, Cunningham II was born to Randall Cunningham and Felicity (née De Jager) in Las Vegas on January 4, 1996. He is well known as the son of 2-time All-American punter and 4-time Pro Bowl quarterback Cunningham. He is also the nephew of College Football Hall of Fame running back Sam Cunningham. In addition, he has two other Cunningham uncles (A.C. and Bruce) who played Division I football. His mother, Felicity, is a native South African who was formerly a professional ballerina with the Dance Theatre of Harlem. His younger sister, Vashti Cunningham, is a World Indoor Champion and subsequently signed a professional contract with Nike while still in high school.  His brother, Christian, died at age 2. Cunningham also competed in the long jump in high school.

As of his junior year in high school, Cunningham intended to compete in both football and track in college, although his father's alma mater, UNLV, does not have a men's track program. Baylor, who made him his first offer, has coined the nickname RC2, a reference to RG3, for him.

Notes

External links
Cunningham's high jump stats at Dyestat.com
 Cunningham's track stats at Athletic.net
 Cunningham's football stats
 Cunningham's USC bio

1996 births
Living people
American male high jumpers
Bishop Gorman High School alumni
Sportspeople from Las Vegas
Track and field athletes from Nevada
USC Trojans men's track and field athletes